Černík may refer to:

 Černík, Slovakia, a village and a municipality in Slovakia
 Černík, a Czech surname, which may refer to:
 František Černík (born 1953), Czechoslovakian ice hockey player
 František Černík (water polo) (1900–1982), Czech water polo player
 Martin Černík (born 1976), Czech snowboarder
 Oldřich Černík (1921–1994), Czech politician and Prime Minister of Czechoslovakia 1968–1970
 Vladimír Černík (1917-2002), Czechoslovakian tennis player

See also
 Cernik (disambiguation)